Saeed Ahmed Khan Manais (born 14 August 1948) is a Pakistani politician  who was a member of the National Assembly of Pakistan, from June 2013 to May 2018 and was a member of the Provincial Assembly of the Punjab between 1985 and 1999.

Early life and education
He was born on 14 August 1951.

In 2007, Manais was alleged to hold a fake BBA degree.

Political career
He was elected to the Provincial Assembly of the Punjab from Constituency PP-178 (Vehari) in 1985 Pakistani general election. During his tenure as Member of the Punjab Assembly, he served as Provincial Minister of Punjab for Communication and Works, Food and Transport in the provincial Punjab cabinet of Chief Minister Nawaz Sharif.

He was re-elected to the Provincial Assembly of the Punjab as a candidate of Islami Jamhoori Ittehad (IJI) from Constituency PP-193 (Vehari-II) in 1988 Pakistani general election. He received 26,919 votes and defeated Hayatullah Khan, a candidate of Pakistan Peoples Party (PPP). During his tenure as member of the Punjab Assembly, he served as Provincial Minister of Punjab for Agriculture in the provincial Punjab cabinet of Chief Minister Nawaz Sharif.

He was re-elected to the Provincial Assembly of the Punjab as a candidate of IJI from Constituency PP-193 (Vehari-II) in 1990 Pakistani general election. He received 41,361 votes and defeated Muhammad Aslam Khan, a candidate of Pakistan Democratic Alliance (PDA). He served as the Speaker of the Provincial Assembly of Punjab for a period of six month from May 1993 to October 1993.

He ran for the seat of the Provincial Assembly of the Punjab as a candidate of Pakistan Muslim League (Jinnah) (PML-J) from Constituency PP-193 (Vehari-II) in 1993 Pakistani general election but was unsuccessful. He received 24,552 votes and lost the seat to Muhammad Aslam Khan, an independent candidate.

He was re-elected to the Provincial Assembly of the Punjab as a candidate of PML-J from Constituency PP-193 (Vehari-II) in 1997 Pakistani general election. He received 27,735 votes and defeated Irshad Ahmad Ghallvi, a candidate of Pakistan Muslim League (N) (PML-N). He served as Leader of the Opposition in the Provincial Assembly of the Punjab from June 1997 to October 1999.

Manais ran for the seat of the National Assembly of Pakistan as an independent candidate from Constituency NA-169 (Vehari-III) and from Constituency NA-170 (Vehari-IV) in 2008 Pakistani general election but was unsuccessful. He received 45,828 from Constituency NA-169 (Vehari-III) and lost the seat to Tehmina Daultana, and received 5,875 votes from Constituency NA-170 (Vehari-IV) and lost the seat to Mehmood Hayat Khan.

He was elected to the National Assembly as a candidate of PML-N from Constituency NA-170 (Vehari-IV) in 2013 Pakistani general election. He received 83,895 votes and defeated Aurangzaib Khan Khichi, a candidate of Pakistan Tehreek-e-Insaf (PTI).

References

Living people
1951 births
Pakistani MNAs 2013–2018
Pakistan Muslim League (J) politicians
Pakistan Muslim League (N) MNAs
Speakers of the Provincial Assembly of the Punjab
Punjab MPAs 1985–1988
Punjab MPAs 1988–1990
Punjab MPAs 1990–1993
Punjab MPAs 1997–1999